Karin Lewicki is an internationally noted American writer. She started in television as Winnie Holzman's assistant on Once and Again, and has a screenplay on The Black List, Haley Means Unplugged.

Her credits include Dawson's Creek and Cold Case, and she was one of the early contributors to the literary magazine Juked. She attended Harvard University, and lives in Los Angeles, California. Her academic work focuses on psychiatry and motherhood.

References

External links
 
 Juked Archive

American television writers
Living people
Harvard University alumni
American women television writers
Date of birth missing (living people)
Place of birth missing (living people)
1977 births
21st-century American women